Coláiste Stiofáin Naofa is an educational institution in Cork city in Ireland. Like other further education colleges in Ireland, the college offers further education courses, including Post Leaving Certificate courses.

Coláiste Stiofáin Naofa has been involved in adult education and further education since 1986. Courses offered include radio broadcasting, art, furniture design, construction technologies, humanities, business, information technology, performing arts, and music.

Between 2011 and 2019, the college was subject to separate investigations for "breaches of procurement rules", facilities concerns, and funding "irregularities".

Former students
Past students have included:
 Damien Cahalane, hurler and Gaelic footballer
 Mick Flannery, singer and songwriter
 Sinéad Lohan, singer and songwriter
 Chiedozie Ogbene, footballer
 The Frank and Walters,  alternative pop band
 Nora Twomey, animator, producer and voice actress

References

External links
 

Education in Cork (city)
Further education colleges in County Cork